Musa Bilankulu (born 22 February 1985) is a South African professional footballer who last played for Bizana Pondo Chiefs, as a defender.

Club career
Born in Vosloorus, Bilankulu began his career with Golden Arrows in 2005. He later played for Bidvest Wits, Bloemfontein Celtic, Golden Arrows for a second spell, and Bizana Pondo Chiefs.

He signed for Bizana Pondo Chiefs in December 2020, in a deal until the end of the season.

International career
He received his first call-up to the South African national team in November 2011.

Personal life
Bilankulu married his long-term girlfriend in March 2020.

References

1985 births
Living people
South African soccer players
Lamontville Golden Arrows F.C. players
Bidvest Wits F.C. players
Bloemfontein Celtic F.C. players
Bizana Pondo Chiefs F.C. players
South African Premier Division players
National First Division players
Association football defenders